Brother and Sister is an 1890 bronze sculpture by Auguste Rodin.

Background
Rodin’s older sister, Maria, died in 1862, causing Rodin to enter a religious order and to stop his work for months.

Interpretation
The sculpture may reflect memories of the lost love between brother and sister.

See also

1890 in art
List of sculptures by Auguste Rodin

References

External links

1890 sculptures
Bronze sculptures
Collection of the Portland Art Museum
Nude sculptures
Sculptures by Auguste Rodin
Sculptures of children